Francesco Moschini (born 1948, Bogliaco, (fraction of Gargnano), Italy) is an Italian architect, art historian, historian and professor of architecture at the Polytechnic University of Bari. Since 2008 he has been appointed member of the Accademia di San Luca and since 2011 he is its general secretary. 

Biography
In 1969, after his secondary studies in Brescia, he moved to Rome to attend the Centro sperimentale di cinematografia, at the same time he enrolled in the Faculty of Architecture at the University of Rome. At the same time he follows a series of courses at the Faculty of Letters and philosophy, where he takes exams with Giulio Carlo Argan, Emilio Garroni, Alberto Asor Rosa and with Ferruccio Marotti. 
Since 1974 he has been a member of the International Association of Art Critics (IAIS). He is a member of the Scientific Council of certain magazines, including "Paesaggio Urbano", "Il Disegno di Architettura" and of the "Centro di Studi per la Storia dell'Architettura" Center for Studies for the History of architecture. From 1982 to 1985, he collaborated with the magazine Domus.
In 1978, he founded in Rome the  A.A.M. Architettura Arte Moderna  a center for the production and promotion of cultural initiatives. Since 1993 opened a new head office of A.A.M. in Milan.
In 2003 in Bari, at the Department of Architecture and Town Planning of the Polytechnic School of Bari, he created the Fondo Francesco Moschini consisting of a donation of more than 70,000 volumes, already from its private library.

Books
 Aldo Rossi. Progetti e disegni 1962–1979, Edizioni Centro Di, Firenze settembre 1979 International co-editions: Rizzoli International Publications, New York; Academy Edition, London; L'Équerre editeur, Paris; Xarait, Madrid.
 Mario Bellini. Italian Beauty, Silvana Editoriale, 2017

References

External links
The itineraries, meeting points, new frontiers and mutual contaminations of Art, Architecture, Design and Photography… since 1974,  on www.researchgate.net
 Francesco Moschini Biografia estesa e nota autobiografica 
Attività editoriale e pubblicistica di Francesco Moschini e cataloghi delle mostre
Scheda di autorità OPAC SBN 

1948 births
Architects from Brescia
Italian architecture writers
Italian art historians
Academic staff of the Sapienza University of Rome
Academic staff of the University of Bari
Painters from Rome
Living people